Tolerance is an outdoor 2011 aluminum sculpture by Spanish artist Jaume Plensa, installed along Buffalo Bayou in Houston, Texas, in the United States. It consists of seven separate wire frame human figures on granite pedestals.

See also
 2011 in art
 List of public art in Houston

References

2011 establishments in Texas
2011 sculptures
Aluminum sculptures in Texas
Outdoor sculptures in Houston
Sculptures by Jaume Plensa
Statues in Houston